Agira, War Canadian Cemetery
 Cimitero Vantiniano (also known as Vantiniano) in Brescia – is one of the first monumental cemetery built in Italy, resting place of the former Italian Prime Minister Giuseppe Zanardelli
 Bronte, English cemetery Nelson Castle, with the poet's grave William Sharp.
 Caltagirone, Cimitero monumentale di Caltagirone
 Caltanissetta, Cimitero monumentale degli Angeli
 Canicattini Bagni, monumental cemetery of Canicattini Bagni.
 Cimitero monumentale di Catania, tombs of Giovanni Verga, Mario Rapisardi, Antonino Gandolfo, Federico De Roberto, Angelo Musco.
 Catania War Cemetery.
 Cemeteries in Cesena
 Chiavari (Cimitero urbano di Chiavari)
 Corleone, in the municipal cemetery are buried: the Mafia leaders Luciano Liggio, Michele Navarra, Salvatore Riina and the ashes of Bernardo Provenzano, the remains of the trade unionist Placido Rizzotto murdered by the mafia and of the magistrate Cesare Terranova killed by the mafia.
 Monumental Cemetery of Cremona
 Cuneo (Cimitero comunale urbano di Cuneo)
 Faenza (Cimitero dell'Osservanza)
 English Cemetery, Florence – burial site for Elizabeth Barrett Browning, Frances Trollope, Theodore Parker and others;
 Lentini, monumental cemetery of Lentini
 Old English Cemetery, Livorno – probably the first Protestant burial ground in Italy, resting place of Tobias Smollett
 Monumental Cemetery of Mantua
 Cimitero monumentale di Messina or "Gran Camposanto"
 English cemetery of Messina, which recalls the visit in 1925 of king George V to Messina
 Cimitero Monumentale in Milan is a very large cemetery that includes the Famedio (Temple of Fame) where Vladimir Horowitz, Alessandro Manzoni, Arturo Toscanini, and others are interred
 Mistretta, monumental cemetery of Mistretta
 English Cemetery, Naples
 Cemetery of Poggioreale, Naples
 Cemetery of the 366 Fossae, Naples
 Palazzolo Acreide, monumental cemetery of Palazzolo Acreide
 Palermo, Catacombe dei Cappuccini
 Cimitero dei Cappuccini(Palermo), there are buried: Giuseppe Tomasi di Lampedusa, writer, and Pio La Torre, trade unionist and politician, killed by the mafia
 Palermo, Cimitero di Santa Maria dei Rotoli
 Palermo, Cimitero di Sant'Orsola: it was the place where the remains of Giovanni Falcone rested for 23 years, later transferred on 23 June 2015 to the Church of San Domenico; tomb of Fulco di Verdura
 English Cemetery (Palermo)
 Cimitero Acattolico (Palermo, cemetery for non-Catholics)
 Cimitero di Santa Maria di Gesù (Palermo), the magistrate Paolo Borsellino murdered by the mafia is buried here
 Campo Verano, Rome
 Protestant Cemetery, Rome – resting place of Percy Bysshe Shelley, John Keats
 Castagna Cemetery, Sampierdarena, Genoa
 Germanic military cemetery of Motta Sant'Anastasia
 Cimitero Monumentale di Staglieno, Genoa—famous for its sepulchral sculpture and architecture
 Fontanelle cemetery in Naples
 Syracuse War Cemetery: British war cemetery
 Non-Catholic Cemetery of Syracuse, in the park of the Paolo Orsi Regional Archaeological Museum: tomb of August von Platen
 Taormina, non-Catholic cemetery, tomb of Wilhelm von Gloeden
 Monumental Cemetery of Turin
 San Michele, Venice  Venice's main cemetery and resting place of Ezra Pound, Igor Stravinsky and Sergei Diaghilev
 Monumental Cemetery of Verona

References 

Italy
 
Cemeteries
Cemeteries